Amma Asante  (born 13 September 1969) is a British filmmaker, screenwriter, former actress, and Chancellor at Norwich University of the Arts, who was born in London to parents from Ghana. Her love for the film industry started when she received her first role in BBC's Grange Hill. Asante wrote and produced the 1998 BBC Two series Brothers and Sisters, starring David Oyelowo. She was a childhood friend of model Naomi Campbell, whom she met when they were seven years old.

Early and personal life 
Amma Asante was born in Lambeth, London, to Ghanaian parents: her mother was an entrepreneur who owned her own African cosmetics and grocery shop, and her accountant father received qualifications to work in the United Kingdom. Asante attended the Barbara Speake Stage School in Acton, where she trained in dance and drama. She appeared in the "Just Say No" anti-drugs campaign of the 1980s and was one of nine Grange Hill children to take it to the Reagan White House. She gained credits in other British television series, including Desmond's (Channel 4) and Birds of a Feather (BBC 1), and was a Children's Channel presenter for a year.

Asante was previously married to producer Charlie Hanson. She is now married to Søren Pedersen, former spokesman for European police in The Hague.

Writing and directing career 
Asante's career started when she first attended a performing arts school that allowed her to draft her first sitcom script. Later, she became a child actress and made her first appearances on television in Grange Hill and Desmond's. In her late teens, Asante left acting and worked in screenwriting with a development deal from Chrysalis. She founded a production company, Tantrum Films, where she wrote and produced two series of the BBC Two drama Brothers and Sisters (1998).

A Way of Life
Asante used Tantrum Films to make her directorial debut with a feature film, A Way of Life (2004). It was developed and financed through the UK Film Council and produced by Peter Edwards, Patrick Cassavetti and Golden Globe Award and BAFTA Award winner Charlie Hanson. Her first film, A Way of Life, focused on the life of a single mother, played by Stephanie James. It details the reality of a woman who recounts the suicidal death of her mother and the presence of foster care. It also introduces her brother Gavin, played by Nathan Jones, who was also taken into foster care. As a young 17-year-old, Leigh Anne (Stephanie James), finds it difficult to get by, especially due to the medical expenses that her daughter Eli Williams, incurred. It also touches on the theme of cultural conflict, with their neighbour Hassan Osman (played by Oliver Haden), who had been the victim of a beating, after being accused of reporting Leigh Anne to social services for child neglect. The film has been described as "one of the most warmly received UK titles in the London Film Festival in the autumn and a harrowing drama in social realist mode". On 17 January 2005, the Times said: "She is one of the most exciting prospects in British cinema to emerge in the past 12 months."

In November 2004, the London Film Festival awarded Asante the inaugural Alfred Dunhill UK Film Talent Award. In February 2005 Asante was named The Times newspaper's Breakthrough Artist of the Year and was nominated for Best Newcomer at both the Evening Standard and London Film Critics award ceremonies. That same month at the BAFTA Film Awards, Asante received the Carl Foreman Award for Special Achievement by a British Writer, director, or Producer in Their First Feature Film, which she has since cited as being a big break in her career. The 2005 Miami International Film Festival awarded A Way of Life as Best Dramatic Feature in World Cinema and the FIPRESCI prize (International Federation of Film Critics prize) for Best Feature Film. The Wales Chapter of BAFTA gave A Way of Life four of its top awards in April 2005, including Best Director and Best Film. Additionally, Asante was awarded for this film by the San Sebastian Film Festival in Spain and the Mar del Plata Film Festival in Argentina.

Belle
Asante has developed film projects in both the UK and US. Her second feature film, Belle (2013), is a historical romance. The film is based on Dido Elizabeth Belle, and depicts an illegitimate mixed-race daughter of an enslaved African woman and a Royal Navy captain. He placed the girl into the care of his uncle (and Belle's great-uncle) Lord Mansfield and his wife in late 18th-century London. In this film, Dido was being raised by a white aristocratic family and acquired many intellectual skills. She uses her personal experiences to debate the social and structural issues of her time, such as gender roles and abolitionism. Dido's role in the film has been said to be "a way that is usually denied to historical black women".

The film stars Gugu Mbatha-Raw as the eponymous Dido Elizabeth Belle, Tom Wilkinson as Lord Mansfield, who as a justice, ruled on two important cases related to slavery; Emily Watson as his wife and Miranda Richardson, Sarah Gadon, Tom Felton, and Sam Reid. Belle was the third project to receive investment from Pinewood Studios as part of its Pinewood Films initiative, established to help fund and support British independent films. The film was shot on location in the Isle of Man, London and Oxford. It was distributed through Fox Searchlight Pictures. A special screening of the film took place at the United Nations headquarters in New York on 2 April 2014, as part of the UN commemorative events on slavery and the transatlantic slave trade. Asante and star Gugu Mbatha-Raw attended the screening at the United Nations headquarters. The same week, Asante was honoured by BAFTA in both Los Angeles and New York as a "Brit to Watch", where special screenings of Belle were held to celebrate her work. At the 2014 Miami International Film Festival, Asante was awarded The Signis Award as director of Belle.

A United Kingdom
In January 2014, it was announced that Asante would direct a thriller, Unforgettable, for Warner Bros. but she eventually left the project, announcing in March 2015 that she would instead be directing A United Kingdom, a period piece based on the interracial romance between Seretse Khama and Ruth Williams. The film A United Kingdom, which Asante directed in 2016, features David Oyelowo and Rosamund Pike portraying the main protagonists of the real-life story, who marry, and with the coming independence of Bechuanaland, decide to move back there, despite British opposition to their relationship. A United Kingdom is based on the 2006 book by historian Susan Williams entitled Colour Bar: The Triumph of Seretse Khama and His Nation. Brunson Green details the filming process by explaining that "you could tell there were about 250 movie moments in this biography of this amazing couple, and so we kind of culled through all those moments and tried to figure out a storyline". During the IFP Gotham Independent Film Awards ceremony, Oyelowo mentions adding A United Kingdom to his list of movies because it was an African-based story directed by a female filmmaker. In June 2016, the British Film Institute (BFI) announced that A United Kingdom would open the 60th London Film Festival.

Recent projects
Asante is a contributor to the 2019 anthology New Daughters of Africa, edited by Margaret Busby.

Asante directed "Useful", episode 3 in series 3 of Hulu streaming service's series The Handmaid's Tale. The series is based on Canadian writer Margaret Atwood's 1985 novel of the same name. The episode first screened on 5 June 2019. In the 2020 and 2021 Powerlist, Asante was listed in the Top 100 of the most influential people in the UK of African/African-Caribbean descent.

Asante is set to direct the Cold War thriller The Billion Dollar Spy starring Mads Mikkelsen

Awards
Asante was appointed Member of the Order of the British Empire (MBE) in the 2017 Birthday Honours for services to film.

In 2018, Asante became the first woman to receive the British Urban Film Festival honorary award from actress Dona Croll for outstanding contribution to film and television.

Professional associations and interests
Asante is a past elected member of BAFTA Council and a past BAFTA Film committee member. In 2014 she was made an Honorary Associate of the London Film School, where she earlier served as a Governor (2006–2007).

She travelled to Washington, DC, for an anti-drugs campaign, and then met with former First Lady Nancy Reagan.

Filmography

Film

Television

References

Further reading
Jenelle Riley, "Toronto Film Fest: Filmmaker Amma Asante on 'Belle'" (interview), Backstage, 10 September 2013 
Video: "Amma Asante, Gugu Mbatha Raw, Tom Wilkinson, Tom Felton, Penelope Wilton, Miranda Richardson and Emily Watson discuss the film at the Toronto International Film Festival 2013", The Hollywood Reporter video

External links
Official website

1969 births
Living people
People from the London Borough of Lambeth
British women film directors
British television actresses
British women screenwriters
English people of Ghanaian descent
Actresses from London
20th-century British actresses
Writers from London
English women film directors
Film directors from London
Members of the Order of the British Empire
Outstanding Debut by a British Writer, Director or Producer BAFTA Award winners
WFTV Award winners
People educated at Barbara Speake Stage School
Black British cinema
20th-century English women
20th-century English people
British women television directors
Black British filmmakers